Alfred D. Lerner (September 19, 1928 – August 3, 2009) was an American politician who served in the New York State Assembly from 1957 to 1964 and from 1967 to 1971.

He died on August 3, 2009, in New York City, New York at age 80.

References

1928 births
2009 deaths
Republican Party members of the New York State Assembly
20th-century American politicians